Group 8 of the UEFA Euro 1976 qualifying tournament was one of the eight groups to decide which teams would qualify for the UEFA Euro 1976 finals tournament. Group 8 consisted of four teams: West Germany, Greece, Bulgaria, and Malta, where they played against each other home-and-away in a round-robin format. The group winners were West Germany, who finished two points above Greece.

Final table

Matches

 (*)NOTE: Attendance also reported as 30,000.(**)NOTE: Referee also reported as Alberto Lattanzi. 

 (*)NOTE: Attendance also reported as 22,000 

 (*)NOTE: Attendance also reported as 60,000.

Goalscorers

References
 
 
 

Group 8
Qualifying
1974–75 in German football
1975–76 in German football
1974–75 in Greek football
1975–76 in Greek football
1974–75 in Bulgarian football
1975–76 in Bulgarian football